Federal Highway 57 (Carretera Federal 57) (Fed. 57) is a free (libre) part of the federal highways corridors (los corredores carreteros federales) of Mexico.

The 1301.83 km (808.92 mi) highway connects Mexico City with Piedras Negras, Coahuila. This road links many major highways in the country, forming the backbone of the road network in Mexico. In the eastern Mexican Plateau, (the western foothills of Sierra Madre Oriental), Fed. 57 connects points in the north including Monclova to San Luis Potosí in the south. The road passes through the following states and cities:

Coahuila
Saltillo
Ramos Arizpe
Castaños
Monclova
Frontera
Sabinas
Allende
Nava
Piedras Negras

Nuevo León
San Roberto
San Rafael

San Luis Potosí
Santa María del Río
San Luis Potosí
Villa Hidalgo
Matehuala

Guanajuato
San Luis de la Paz

Querétaro
San Juan del Río
Pedro Escobedo
Santiago de Querétaro

State of Mexico
San Francisco Soyaniquilpan
Polotitlán

Hidalgo
Tepeji de Ocampo

State of Mexico
Cuautitlán
Tepotzotlán
Coyotepec

Federal District

Mexico City

Note: As Fed. 57-D, Autopista Chamapa-La Venta skirts the western edge of Greater Mexico City through the State of Mexico and the western Federal District.

References

057
1057
Transportation in Coahuila
Transportation in Guanajuato
Transportation in Hidalgo
Transportation in Mexico City
Transportation in Nuevo León
Transportation in Querétaro
Transportation in San Luis Potosí
Transportation in the State of Mexico
Transportation in Tamaulipas